Selawik may refer to:
 Selawik, Alaska
 Selawik Lake
 Selawik River
 Selawik National Wildlife Refuge
 Selawik, a freely licensed font from Microsoft